Shalom College is a residential college located on the Kensington campus of the University of New South Wales in Sydney, Australia. The College was founded in 1973. Although it is run by Sydney's Jewish community and observes Jewish culture, the college is open to people of all religions, creeds and backgrounds. The college is run by The Shalom Institute, a not-for-profit Jewish educational organisation. It also plays host to a number of organisations and projects from within the Jewish, academic and general communities.

In 2019 the college housed 133 students from many countries, in both undergraduate and postgraduate degrees.

References

Residential colleges of the University of New South Wales
Educational institutions established in 1973
1973 establishments in Australia